Osita Iheme, MFR (born 20 February 1982) is a Nigerian actor, Producer and author. He is widely known for playing the role of Pawpaw in the film Aki na Ukwa alongside Chinedu Ikedieze. Osita Iheme is the founder of Inspired Movement Africa which he founded to inspire, motivate and stimulate the minds of young Nigerians and Africans. In 2007, Iheme received the Lifetime Achievement Award at the African Movie Academy Awards. He is considered to be one of Nigeria's most famous actors. In 2011, Osita Iheme was honored as a Member of the Order of the Federal Republic (MFR) by President Goodluck Jonathan. He has an estimated net worth of 560 million naira.

Early life
Osita Iheme was born into a family of five with his siblings and parents all being taller than him, his father being Mr Herbert Iheme and mother being Mrs Augustina Iheme.  Born on February 20, 1982, Iheme hails from Mbaitoli, Imo State, Nigeria. He grew up in Abia State and has an MBA degree from Institute of Management and Technology, Enugu (IMT). After completing his studies at IMT, he initially wanted to become a lawyer, but pursued his career in film acting in 1998 and initially featured in small roles.

Career 

In his career, Osita Iheme was often typecast in the role of a child, a pattern that followed him well into adulthood. In 2002, he rose to fame when he starred together with Chinedu Ikedieze in the comedy film Aki na Ukwa in which he played the role of Pawpaw. In this role, Osita Iheme played a mischievous child.

He is the New Generation Ambassador for Rotary International District 9110 and the author of the book INSPIRED 101. Osita Iheme has starred in over a hundred movies. Like his on-screen partner Chinedu Ikedieze, Iheme has a small physique, making him different from other actors in the Nigerian movie industry.

He has evolved in his career from a comedic actor to a multifaceted established actor.

Both Chinedu and Osita have been maintaining onscreen and offscreen chemistry which is widely praised by the Nollywood fraternity.

He revealed in 2018, however, that he had desires and hopes to become a politician in the near future.

Honor 
To reward his contribution towards comedy genre movies Nigerian Film Industry, in 2011 he was awarded the Nigerian National Honor of Member of the Order of the Federal Republic (MFR) by President Goodluck Jonathan.  In 2007 he was given the lifetime Achievement award by AMAA (African movie Academy Awards).

Influence 
Osita Iheme's performance alongside fellow little person actor Chinedu Ikedieze in the 2002 film Aki na Ukwa is still widely spoken about and the duo, especially Osita's character, on-screen trending through memes since 2019 on Twitter and other social media platforms. This eventually earned him a global fanbase.

Filmography 

 Welcome To Africa (2023)
 Aki and Pawpaw (2022)
 Christmas in Miami (2021)
 Games men play 5: Computer Games is our Game (2018)
 Ada My Love (2018)
 The Self-Destruction of Little Mark (2017)
 Double Mama (2015)
 Mirror Boy (2010)
 Markus D Millionaire (2008)
 Stubborn Flies (2007)
 Boys from Holland (2006)
 Brain Box (2006)
 Criminal Law (2006)
 Jadon (2006)
 Last Challenge (2006)
 Remote Control (2006)
 Royal Messengers (2006)
 Winning Your Love (2006) 
 Colours of Emotion (2005)* Final World Cup (2005)
 Holy Diamond (2005)
 I Think Twice (2005)
 My Business (2005)
 The Last Orphan 
 Reggae Boys (2005)
 Secret Adventure (2005)
 Spoiler (2005)
 Village Boys (2005)
 American Husband (2004)
 Big Daddies (2004)
 Columbia Connection (2004)
 Daddy Must Obey (2004)
 Mr.Ibu (2004)
  Baby Police 2 (2004)
 John and Johnny Just Come (2003)
 Green Snake (2003)
 2 Rats (2003)
 Aki na ukwa (2003)
 I'm in Love (2003)
 Baby Police (2003)
 Back from America 2 (2003)
 Charge & Bail (2003)
 Tell Them (2003)
 Oke Belgium (2003)
 Good Mother (2003)
 Informant (2003)
 Johnny Just Come (2003)
 Nicodemus (2003)
 Nwa Teacher (2003)
 Twin Brothers (2003)
 Aka Gum (2002)
 Okwu na uka (2002)

References

External links 

Igbo male actors
1982 births
Nigerian male film actors
Actors with dwarfism
Living people
Male actors from Imo State
21st-century Nigerian male actors
Lifetime Achievement Award Africa Movie Academy Award winners
Members of the Order of the Federal Republic
People from Imo State